This is a list of Television in South Korea related events from 2021.

Ongoing

Animation

New Series & Returning Shows

Animation

Drama

Ending

Animation

Drama

Reference

2021 in South Korean television